Crown of Thorns' Church, located at 67 Texaco Road, is an Anglican church in Hong Kong. It forms a parish in the Diocese of Western Kowloon under Hong Kong Sheng Kung Hui. The vicar of the parish is Jonathan Chee, who is also the current General Secretary of the Diocese of Western Kowloon.

Crown of Thorns

In Christianity, the Crown of Thorns, one of the instruments of the Passion, was the woven chaplet of thorn branches worn by Jesus before his crucifixion. It is mentioned in the Gospels of Matthew (27:29), Mark (15:17), and John (19:2, 5) and is often alluded to by the early Christian Fathers, such as Clement of Alexandria, Origen, and others.

John the Evangelist describes it thus (KJV, ch. 19):

History
The Church was found in 1965. The first vicar was Peter Kwong, the former Archbishop of Hong Kong.

Educational institutions served by the Church
 SKH Lam Woo Memorial Secondary School
 SKH Chu Oi Primary School
 SKH Chu Yan Primary School
 SKH Ho Chak Wan Primary School
 SKH Tsing Yi Chu Yan Primary School
 SKH Tsing Yi Estate Ho Chak Wan Primary School
 SKH Yan Laap Memorial Primary School
 SKH Yan Laap Primary School

See also

 Anglicanism
 Diocese of Western Kowloon
 Hong Kong Sheng Kung Hui

References

External links

 SKH Crown of Thorns' Church

Tsuen Wan District
Anglican Diocese of Western Kowloon
Anglican church buildings in Hong Kong